Tiit Arge (born 29 May 1963 in Tallinn) is an Estonian politician. He was a member of VII Riigikogu.

References

Living people
1963 births
Pro Patria Union politicians
Members of the Riigikogu, 1992–1995
Politicians from Tallinn